Statue of Frederick the Great may refer to:

 Equestrian statue of Frederick the Great, Unter den Linden, Berlin
 Statue of Frederick the Great (Charlottenburg Palace), Berlin